Ottilie Grete Abrahams (2 September 19372 July 2018) was a Namibian educator, activist, and politician.

Personal
Abrahams was born on 2 September 1937 in the Old Location township outside of Windhoek. Abrahams was the daughter of Otto Schimming and Charlotte Schimming. Her father was the first Black teacher in Namibia. Her sister Nora Schimming-Chase became the first Namibian ambassador to Germany after the independence of Namibia. Before obtaining a degree in Cape Town, she attended Trafalgar High School in District Six in Cape Town.

She and her husband Kenneth Abrahams raised four children, one daughter is the scientist and activist Yvette Abrahams, her son Kenneth Abrahams overtook the management of the Jacob Marengo School after her death. At the time of her death, she lived in the affluent suburb of Klein Windhoek. The Namibian newspaper memorialized her as the "Mother of Education."

Activism
Abrahams became politically active while studying in high school and university in Cape Town, South Africa; she joined the South West Africa Student Body in 1952 and later became active in the Cape Peninsula Students Union and the Non-European Unity Movement. She and other activists formed the Yu Chi Chan Club, a secret Maoist organization. In 1985, Abrahams founded the Jacob Marengo Tutorial College in Katutura, of which she was still the principal until her death.

Politics
Abrahams was active in the independence movement with several political parties. Abrahams was part of SWAPO from 1960 to 1963. She, her husband and fellow activist, Kenneth Abrahams, fellow SWAPO dissidents Emil Appolus and Andreas Shipanga formed SWAPO Democrats while in exile in Sweden.  However, she left SWAPO Democrats in 1980 and later joined the Namibia Independence Party, where she served as the Secretary General and Publicity and Information Secretary. The Namibia Independence Party was part of the Namibia National Front coalition which won one seat in the 1989 election to the Constitution-writing Constituent Assembly of Namibia.

Life in exile 
From 1963 until 1978 Ottilie Abrahams lived in exile with her husband and their children. They lived in Dar es salam, Tanzania and Lusaka, Zambia and for nine years in Stockholm, Sweden. With United Nations Security Council Resolution 435 they returned to Namibia in 1978.

Notes

References

External links 

 Interview with Ottilie Abrahams by Tor Sellström 16 March 1995 within the project Nordic Documentation on the Liberation Struggle in Southern Africa
 Jacob Marengo Tutorial College

1937 births
2018 deaths
SWAPO Democrats politicians
Namibian expatriates in Sweden
Namibian expatriates in South Africa
Namibian expatriates in Zambia
Politicians from Windhoek
Alumni of Trafalgar High School (Cape Town)
Namibian educators